Stomias boa boa, also called the scaly dragonfish or boa dragonfish, is a subspecies of abyssal barbeled dragonfish of the family Stomiidae. It is found at great depths worldwide in tropical to temperate oceans but is absent from the northern Pacific and northwest Atlantic Oceans.

Description
Stomias boa boa is a long, slender fish. The head is small, and the mouth has a protuberant lower jaw and sharp, pointed teeth. It is very scary looking due to its "sharp fangs," say local fishermen. There is a large fleshy barbel projecting from the chin with a pale stalk, a dark spot at the base of the bulb and a dark filament. The dorsal fin has no spines and 17 to 22 soft rays and the anal fin has 18 to 22 soft rays. The dorsal and anal fins are positioned on the slender caudal peduncle and the caudal fin is forked. The skin is covered in small hexagonal scales. Like many fish of deep oceans, it has large eyes and is transparent and silvery in appearance with iridescent speckles.

Distribution and habitat
Stomias boa boa has a wide distribution, being found in the eastern Atlantic Ocean, the western Mediterranean Sea, the west coast of Africa as far south as Mauritania and southern Africa from Angola to the Cape of Good Hope. On the other side of the Atlantic it is found from the Northwest Territories of Canada to Argentina. It is also known from Chile and the sub-Antarctic region of the Indian Ocean south to Heard Island.

Ecology
Stomias boa boa is a predator and mainly feeds on fish. It is itself preyed on by the deepwater hakes Merluccius paradoxus and Merluccius capensis, the blackmouth catshark Galeus melastomus and the swordfish Xiphias gladius.

Stomias boa boa has large light-producing photophores behind the eyes and other smaller ones scattered across the body in a geometrical pattern, mostly on the ventral surface. Special organs near the eyes detect the amount of illumination in the surrounding water and this enables the fish to adjust the amount of light its photophores emit. The bioluminescence can be turned on and off at will and may confuse potential predators. Other species of fish emit light in a similar way, and the particular arrangement of photophores in the scaly dragonfish permits individuals to identify other fish of the same species.

References

 Tony Ayling & Geoffrey Cox, Collins Guide to the Sea Fishes of New Zealand,  (William Collins Publishers Ltd, Auckland, New Zealand 1982) 

Stomiidae
Fish described in 1810